"Carver High School" or "George Washington Carver High School" may refer to one of the following public secondary schools in the United States:

Alabama 
George Washington Carver High School (Birmingham, Alabama)
George Washington Carver High School (Decatur, Alabama) (closed 1966)
George Washington Carver High School (Dothan, Alabama) (closed 1969)
George Washington Carver High School (Montgomery, Alabama)

Arizona 
Carver High School (Phoenix, Arizona), also known as George Washington Carver High School (closed 1954)

Arkansas 
George Washington Carver High School (Augusta, Arkansas), (closed 1970)
George Washington Carver High School (Marked Tree, Arkansas), (closed 1966)
Carver High School (Lonoke, Arkansas), (closed 1970)

California
George Washington Carver School of Arts and Sciences in Rancho Cordova, California, opened in 2008

Florida 
Carver Heights High School, Leesburg, Florida
Carver-Hill School, Crestview, Florida, integrated into Crestview High School in 1965
George Washington Carver High School (Bunnell, Florida), closed 1970
George Washington Carver School (Coral Gables, Florida), closed 1970
George Washington Carver High School (Delray Beach, Florida), closed 1970
George Washington Carver High School (Naples, Florida), closed 1968

Georgia 
The New Schools at Carver, formerly called Carver High School, Atlanta, Georgia
George Washington Carver High School (Carrollton, Georgia)
George Washington Carver High School (Columbus, Georgia)
Carver High School (Dawson, Georgia), a school for African Americans

Illinois 
Carver Military Academy, formerly known as Carver High School, Chicago, Illinois

Louisiana 
G. W. Carver High School (Hahnville, Louisiana)
G. W. Carver High School (New Orleans)
George Washington Carver High School (Caddo Parish, Louisiana) (1957-1973), later known as Ellerbe Road School
George Washington Carver High School (DeRidder, Louisiana) (1953-1970), now an elementary school
George Washington Carver High School (Kinder, Louisiana) (1950-1970)

Maryland 
Carver Vocational-Technical High School (School #454),  Baltimore City, Maryland
George Washington Carver Center for Arts and Technology, formerly called George Washington Carver High School, Baltimore County, Maryland
George Washington Carver High School (Cumberland, Maryland)
George Washington Carver High School (Rockville, Maryland), closed 1960

Massachusetts 
Carver Middle High School, Carver, Massachusetts

Mississippi 
Allen Carver High School, Charleston, Mississippi closed 1971, black students attend East Tallahatchie High School, became Charleston Middle School
Carver High School (Pascagoula, Mississippi), closed 1971
George Washington Carver High School, formerly Hopewell High School, near Philadelphia, Mississippi, closed 1970
George Washington Carver High School (Picayune, Mississippi), closed 1971
Carver High School (Tupelo, Mississippi), closed 1971

Missouri 
George Washington Carver School (Fulton, Missouri)

New York
George Washington Carver High School, part of the Springfield Gardens High School complex in Springfield Gardens, New York

North Carolina 
George Washington Carver High School (Kannapolis, North Carolina) (closed 1967, reopened as elementary)
Carver High School (Winston-Salem, North Carolina)

Pennsylvania 
Carver High School (Philadelphia, Pennsylvania)

South Carolina
George Washington Carver High School (Spartanburg, South Carolina) (closed 1970), now Carver Junior High

Tennessee 
George Washington Carver High School (Brownsville, Tennessee) (closed 1970)
George Washington Carver High School (Memphis, Tennessee)

Texas 
George Washington Carver High School (Baytown, Texas)
George Washington Carver High School (Ennis, Texas)
Carver High School (Houston, Texas)
Carver High School (Lockhart, Texas)
George Washington Carver High School (Midland, Texas) (closed 1968), now an elementary school for the gifted/talented
George Washington Carver High School (Navasota, Texas)
George Washington Carver High School (Sweeny, Texas) (closed 1966)
George Washington Carver High School (Waco, Texas) (1956-1970), became a YMCA, later a sixth grade

Virginia 
Carver-Price High School, Appomattox, Virginia (closed 1970)
George Washington Carver High School (Chesterfield, Virginia) (closed 1970)
George Washington Carver High School (Martinsville, Virginia)